Cable Mountain is a  elevation Navajo Sandstone summit located in Zion National Park, in Washington County of southwest Utah, United States. It is set on the east side of the North Fork Virgin River which drains precipitation runoff from this mountain. Its neighbors include Angels Landing, Cathedral Mountain, The Organ, and Observation Point. This mountain's name was officially adopted in 1934 by the U.S. Board on Geographic Names. It is so named in association with the draw-works which used cables to lower timber from the top of the plateau down to the valley bottom from 1901 through 1927. Wood
to construct the Zion Lodge came down the cable works. A 7.4-mile trail, much of it an old wagon road, leads to the views from the top.

Climate
Spring and fall are the most favorable seasons to visit Cable Mountain. According to the Köppen climate classification system, it is located in a Cold semi-arid climate zone, which is defined by the coldest month having an average mean temperature below , and at least 50% of the total annual precipitation being received during the spring and summer.

Gallery

Cable Mountain Draw Works
The Cable Mountain Draw Works was built by David Flanigan beginning in 1901, although he had first proposed the system as a teenager in 1885. The system fulfilled an 1863 prophecy made by Brigham Young that timber would descend from the cliffs "like a hawk flying." Before the draw works were constructed, the timber on Cable Mountain was obtained only by a ten-day round trip. Flanigan sold the operation in 1906 to Alfred Stout and O.D. Gifford of Springdale, who operated it as the Cable Mountain Timber Works. The draw works were destroyed by lighting and rebuilt in 1911. Intermittent operation continued until 1926 when the system was abandoned. The cables were removed in 1930. It is the oldest pre-park structure in Zion. The site was individually listed on the National Register of Historic Places on May 24, 1978, reference number 78000281. The chief remaining structure is a wood headframe on Cable Mountain. The structures at the bottom of the cables consisted of snubbing posts to separate the cables. Nothing remains of the lower end of the draw works.

See also

 Geology of the Zion and Kolob canyons area
 Colorado Plateau

References

External links
 Zion National Park National Park Service
 Weather forecast: Cable Mountain
 Cable Mountain Draw Works: National Park Service
 August 2019 rock avalanche investigation: ugspub.nr.utah.gov

Mountains of Utah
Zion National Park
Mountains of Washington County, Utah
Sandstone formations of the United States
Colorado Plateau
Landforms of Washington County, Utah